The 1969–70 season was the 86th football season in which Dumbarton competed at a Scottish national level, entering the Scottish Football League, the Scottish Cup and the Scottish League Cup.  In addition Dumbarton competed in the Stirlingshire Cup.

Scottish Second Division

Although the league campaign saw a great improvement from the previous season, the inability to take points from the 'front-runners' meant that Dumbarton were never really in with a chance of snatching a promotion place and finished in 7th place, with 40 points, 16 behind champions Falkirk.

Scottish League Cup

The League Cup however, brought some cheer, with four wins and a draw from the six sectional games, Dumbarton qualified to meet Brechin City in a play off.  A good home win after a tight draw at Brechin meant a quarter final against Ayr United, who were however to prove too strong.

Scottish Cup

In the Scottish Cup, Dumbarton had an easy time beating non-league Gala Fairydean in the second preliminary round, but it was a huge disappointment to lose in the first round proper to Division 2 strugglers Forfar Athletic at home.

Stirlingshire Cup
Locally, in the Stirlingshire Cup, Dumbarton reached their first final for five years, before losing out to Falkirk.

Friendlies

Player statistics

Squad 

|}

Source:

Transfers
Amongst those players joining and leaving the club were the following:

Players in

Players out 

Source:

References

Dumbarton F.C. seasons
Scottish football clubs 1969–70 season